The 1992 Georgia Bulldogs football team represented the University of Georgia during the 1992 NCAA Division I-A football season. The Bulldogs completed the season with a 10–2 record.

Schedule

Roster

References

Georgia
Georgia Bulldogs football seasons
Citrus Bowl champion seasons
Georgia Bulldogs football